The Oppression Remedy is a book written by David Morritt, Sonia Bjorkquist, and Allan Coleman on corporate litigation.

Law books
Corporate law